Nicholas Necosi Harper (born September 10, 1974) is a former American football cornerback in the National Football League (NFL). He was signed by the Hamilton Tiger-Cats as a street free agent in 2000. He played college football at Fort Valley State University in Fort Valley, Georgia.

Harper played for the Indianapolis Colts and Tennessee Titans. He earned a Super Bowl ring while with the Colts in Super Bowl XLI against the Chicago Bears.

Early years
Harper attended Baldwin High School and was a letterman in football, wrestling, baseball, and track & field. In football, as a senior, he won first-team All-Conference honors and was named the team MVP.

College career
Harper played college football at Fort Valley State University.

Professional career

Hamilton Tiger-Cats
After being declared ineligible for his senior season at Fort Valley State in 2000, Harper signed with the Hamilton Tiger-Cats of the Canadian Football League and appeared in 18 games for the team.

Indianapolis Colts
Harper signed with the Indianapolis Colts on January 16, 2001.

In 2005, the Colts finished first in the AFC with a 14-2 record, the team faced the Pittsburgh Steelers in the second round of the playoffs. With under two minutes remaining in the game and trailing 21-18, Harper picked up a Jerome Bettis fumble near the Indianapolis goal line and returned it to their 43 yard line before getting tackled by Steelers' quarterback Ben Roethlisberger. Colts' commentators, as well as teammates such as Gary Brackett, said had Harper returned the football along the sideline instead of in the middle of the field, or had his leg been 100% healthy, the Colts would have won the game. Indianapolis would end up missing the potential game-tying field goal, and Pittsburgh went on to win Super Bowl XL. 

The following season the Colts won Super Bowl XLI, giving Harper his first Super Bowl ring.

Tennessee Titans
Before the 2007 season, Harper signed a 3-year deal with the Tennessee Titans as a free agent. Harper played in and started 14 games and registered 80 tackles, three interceptions, 14 passes defensed, a forced fumble and a fumble recovery in his first season with the Titans.

In 2008, Harper finished second on the team with 17 passes defensed.

References

External links
Tennessee Titans bio
Current stats

1974 births
Living people
People from Milledgeville, Georgia
Players of American football from Georgia (U.S. state)
American football cornerbacks
Fort Valley State Wildcats football players
Hamilton Tiger-Cats players
Indianapolis Colts players
Tennessee Titans players